Fred Allen (1942 – December 6, 2007) was a Canadian set designer, art director, artist and model maker, from Stewiacke, Nova Scotia.

Early life
Born in Halifax, Nova Scotia in Canada, Allen never knew his birth mother, but was adopted and raised by Gwendolyn Poole of Wolfville, Nova Scotia until her death when Allen was 11. Allen was then raised by Poole's daughter in Stewiacke, Nova Scotia.

Career
Allen began his career in 1962 as a set designer for Neptune Theatre in Halifax, Nova Scotia. He designed and built sets for many television shows, such as Coco, Streets Cents, and Blizzard Island, as well as for feature films and for Parks Canada and the Nova Scotia International Tattoo. He is best known as the creator of the models and sets for the popular children's television series Theodore Tugboat, as well as the vessel Theodore Too.

Death
Allen died in Stewiacke, Nova Scotia on December 6, 2007, at the age of 64 or 65.

Filmography

References

External links
 
 Obituary on Allen Family History Web Page

1942 births
2007 deaths
20th-century artists
Artists from Nova Scotia
Canadian scenic designers
People from Colchester County